Lisa del Giocondo (June 15, 1479 – July 15, 1542) was an Italian noblewoman and member of the Gherardini family of Florence and Tuscany. Her name was given to the Mona Lisa, her portrait commissioned by her husband and painted by Leonardo da Vinci during the Italian Renaissance.

Little is known about Lisa's life. Born in Florence and married in her teens to a cloth and silk merchant who later became a local official, she was a mother to five children and led what is thought to have been a comfortable and ordinary steady income life. Lisa outlived her husband, who was considerably her senior.

In the centuries after Lisa's death, the Mona Lisa became the world's most famous painting. In 2005, Lisa was definitively identified as the model for the Mona Lisa.

Early life 

Lisa's Florentine family was old and aristocratic but over time had lost their influence. They were well off but not wealthy, and lived on farm income in a city that was among the largest in Europe. While economically successful, there were great disparities in wealth among Florence's inhabitants.

Antonmaria di Noldo Gherardini, Lisa's father, came from a family who had lived on properties near San Donato in Poggio and only recently moved to the city.

Antonmaria lost two wives, Lisa di Giovanni Filippo de' Carducci, whom he married in 1465, and Caterina di Mariotto Rucellai, whom he married in 1473. Both died in childbirth. Lisa's mother was Lucrezia del Caccia, daughter of Piera Spinelli, and Gherardini's wife by his third marriage in 1476. Gherardini at one time owned or rented six farms in Chianti that produced wheat, wine and olive oil and where livestock was raised.

Lisa was born in Florence on June 15, 1479, on Via Maggio, although for many years it was thought she was born on Villa Vignamaggio just outside Greve, one of the family's rural properties. She is named for Lisa, a wife of her paternal grandfather. The eldest of seven children, Lisa had three sisters, one of whom was named Ginevra, and three brothers, Giovangualberto, Francesco, and Noldo.

The family lived in Florence, originally near Santa Trinita and later in rented space near Santo Spirito, most likely because they were not able to afford repairs when their first house was damaged. Lisa's family moved to what today is called Via dei Pepi, and then near Santa Croce, where they lived near Ser Piero da Vinci, Leonardo's father. Noldo, Gherardini's father and Lisa's grandfather, had bequeathed a farm in Chianti to the Santa Maria Nuova hospital. Gherardini secured a lease for another of the hospital's farms and, so that he could oversee the wheat harvest, the family spent summers there at the house named Ca' di Pesa.

Marriage and later life 
On March 5, 1495, 15-year-old Lisa married , a modestly successful cloth and silk merchant, becoming his third wife. Lisa's dowry was 170 florins and the San Silvestro farm near her family's country home, which lies between Castellina and San Donato in Poggio, near two farms later owned by Michelangelo. The modest dowry may be a sign that the Gherardini family was not wealthy at the time and lends reason to think she and her husband loved each other. Neither poor nor among the most well-to-do in Florence, the couple lived a middle-class life. Lisa's marriage may have increased her social status because her husband's family may have been richer than her own. Francesco is thought to have benefited because Gherardini is an "old name". They lived in shared accommodation until 5 March 1503, when Francesco was able to buy a house next door to his family's old home in the Via della Stufa. Leonardo is thought to have begun painting Lisa's portrait the same year.

Lisa and Francesco had five children: Piero, Piera, Camilla, Marietta, and Andrea between 1496 and 1502. Lisa lost a baby daughter in 1499. Lisa also raised Bartolomeo, the son of Francesco and his first wife Camilla di Mariotto Rucellai, who died shortly after the birth. The second wife of Lisa's father, Caterina di Mariotto Rucellai, and Francesco's first wife were sisters, members of the Rucellai family.

Camilla and Marietta became Catholic nuns. Camilla took the name Suor Beatrice and entered the convent of San Domenico di Cafaggio, where she was entrusted to the care of Antonmaria's sister Suor Albiera and Lisa's sister Suor Camilla (who was acquitted in a scandalous visitation by four men at the convent) and Suor Alessandra. Beatrice died at age 18 and was buried in the Basilica di Santa Maria Novella. Lisa developed a relationship with Sant'Orsola, a convent held in high regard in Florence, where she was able to place Marietta in 1521. Marietta took the name Suor Ludovica and became a respected member of the convent in a position of some responsibility.

Francesco became an official in Florence. He was elected to the Dodici Buonomini in 1499 and to the Signoria in 1512, where he was confirmed as a Priori in 1524. He may have had ties to Medici family political or business interests. In 1512, when the government of Florence feared the return of the Medici from exile, Francesco was imprisoned and fined 1,000 florins. He was released in September when the Medici returned.

In June 1537, in his will among many provisions, Francesco returned Lisa's dowry to her, gave her personal clothing and jewelry and provided for her future. Upon entrusting her care to their daughter Ludovica and, should she be incapable, his son Bartolomeo, Francesco wrote, "Given the affection and love of the testator towards Mona Lisa, his beloved wife; in consideration of the fact that Lisa has always acted with a noble spirit and as a faithful wife; wishing that she shall have all she needs…"

Death 
In one account, Francesco died in the plague of 1538. Lisa fell ill and was taken by her daughter Ludovica to the convent of Sant'Orsola, where she died on July 15, 1542, at the age of 63. In a scholarly account of their lives, Francesco was nearly 80 years old when he died, and Lisa may have lived until at least 1551, when she would have been 71 or 72.

Mona Lisa 

Like other Florentines of their financial means, Francesco's family members were art lovers and patrons. His son Bartolomeo asked Antonio di Donnino Mazzieri to paint a fresco at the family's burial site in the Basilica della Santissima Annunziata di Firenze. Andrea del Sarto painted a Madonna for another member of his family. Francesco gave commissions to Leonardo for a portrait of his wife and to Domenico Puligo for a painting of Saint Francis of Assisi. He is thought to have commissioned Lisa's portrait to celebrate both Andrea's birth and the purchase of the family's home.

The Mona Lisa fulfilled 15th- and early 16th century requirements for portraying a woman of virtue. Lisa is portrayed as a faithful wife through gesture—her right hand rests over her left. Leonardo also presented Lisa as fashionable and successful, perhaps more well-off than she was. Her dark garments and black veil were Spanish-influenced high fashion; they are not a depiction of mourning for her first daughter, as some scholars have proposed. The portrait is strikingly large; its size is equal to that of commissions acquired by wealthier art patrons of the time. This extravagance has been explained as a sign of Francesco and Lisa's social aspiration.

During the spring of 1503, Leonardo had no income source, which may in part explain his interest in a private portrait. But later that year, he most likely had to delay his work on Mona Lisa when he received payment for starting The Battle of Anghiari, which was a more valuable commission and one he was contracted to complete by February 1505. In 1506, Leonardo considered the portrait unfinished. He was not paid for the work and did not deliver it to his client. The artist's paintings travelled with him throughout his life, and he may have completed the Mona Lisa many years later in France, in one estimation by 1516.

The painting's title dates to 1550. An acquaintance of at least some of Francesco's family, Giorgio Vasari, wrote, "Leonardo undertook to paint, for Francesco del Giocondo, the portrait of Mona Lisa, his wife". The portrait's Italian name La Gioconda is the feminine form of her married name. In French it is known by the variant La Joconde. Though derived from Lisa's married name there is the added significance that the name derives from the word for "happy" (in English, "jocund") or "the happy one".

Speculation assigned Lisa's name to at least four different paintings and her identity to at least ten different people. The theft of the Mona Lisa from the Louvre in 1911 and its travels to Asia and North America during the 1960s and 1970s contributed to the painting's iconization and fame. By the end of the 20th century, the painting was a global icon that had been used in more than 300 other paintings and in 2,000 advertisements, appearing at an average of one new advertisement each week. In 2005, an expert at the University Library of Heidelberg discovered a margin note in the library's collection that established with certainty the traditional view that the sitter was Lisa. The note, written by Agostino Vespucci in 1503, states that Leonardo was working on a portrait of Lisa del Giocondo. The Mona Lisa has been in custody of France since the 16th century, when it was acquired by King Francis I; since the French Revolution, it has been the property of the French Republic. Today about six million people visit the painting each year at the Louvre in Paris, where it is part of a French national collection.

References

Bibliography

Further reading 
 

1479 births
1542 deaths
15th-century Italian women
16th-century Italian women
Italian artists' models
Models from Florence
Mona Lisa
Nobility from Florence